William Clarkson Pierce (September 6, 1909 – September 8, 1981) was an American football player and coach. A Notre Dame player during his college years, he served as the head football coach at Stephen F. Austin State University, Austin College and St. Edward's University in Texas.

Pierce began his coaching career in 1933 at St. Edward's, when he was hired as line coach under head football coach Jack Chevigny. He moved to Austin College the following year to serve in the same capacity under Joseph B. Head.

Pierce was born on September 6, 1909 in Seibert, Colorado. He served in World War II and later worked for Kraft Foods. He retired in 1975 and moved from Champaign, Illinois to Victoria, Texas, where he died in a hospital on September 8, 1981. He was buried at Memory Gardens in Edna, Texas.

Head coaching record

References

1909 births
1981 deaths
American football guards
Austin Kangaroos football coaches
Kraft Foods people
Notre Dame Fighting Irish football players
St. Edward's Crusaders football coaches
Stephen F. Austin Lumberjacks football coaches
People from Kit Carson County, Colorado
Players of American football from Colorado